Mohammad Shaheenul Haque BSP, ndc, hdmc, psc is a Major General of Bangladesh Army. He is the GOC 9th Infantry Division and Area Commander of Savar Area.

Career
Haque was selected at the ISSB for the 20th BMA Long Course and was commissioned in the Corps of Infantry on July 1989. He was awarded with the coveted 'Sword of Honour' for best all-round performance at his commission. Haque was appointed the general officer commanding of the 9th Infantry Division. He had previously served as the commandant of the School of Infantry and Tactics.

References

Living people
Bangladesh Army generals
1969 births